San Antonio de Petrel (Spanish for St. Anthony of Petrel) is a small Chilean village located near the hacienda of the same name, in Pichilemu. According to the 2002 census, the population of San Antonio de Petrel comprised 371 people, and 94 households.

References

Populated places in Pichilemu